Playlist: The Very Best of Mr. Mister is a compilation album by American pop rock band Mr. Mister, released in 2011 by Legacy Recordings as part of their Playlist series. This compilation includes songs from the group's first four studio albums I Wear the Face, Welcome to the Real World, Go On... and Pull.

Reception  

Stephen Thomas Erlewine of Allmusic calls the compilation "a worthwhile overview for all but the serious Mr. Mister fan."

Track listing

Release history

References

External links
Mr. Mister - Playlist: The Very Best Of Mr. Mister at Itunes

2011 greatest hits albums
Mr. Mister albums
RCA Records compilation albums
Mr. Mister